Ecuadorian Americans (or ) are Americans of full or partial Ecuadorian ancestry. Ecuadorian Americans are the 9th largest Latin American group in the United States.
Ecuadorian Americans are usually of European (mainly Spanish), Mestizo, Amerindian or Afro-Ecuadorian background.

History 

Until the 1960s, very few Ecuadorians migrated to the United States. Between the years of 1930 to 1959, 11,025 Ecuadorians received lawful permanent resident status in the United States. From here, slow trickles of emigration continued. Trade relations with and seasonal migration to New York became an avenue for emigration in the 1950s and 1960s. In the late 1960s, several waves of migration started. Most Ecuadorian immigration to the United States has occurred since the early 1970s. This emigration was because of several reasons: The first of them was that United States immigration law changed.

Before 1965, national quotas on immigrants favored more European immigration than Latin American immigration. After 1965, changes in immigration law made it easier for Latin Americans and other foreign groups to emigrate to United States. In addition, the price of air travel lowered making immigration more accessible to Latin Americans. They were drawn to the U.S. for economic opportunities and political freedoms.

Another factor in Ecuadorian emigration was the 1964 Ecuadorian land reform. This improved the lives of many Ecuadorian poor, but also had far-reaching and unpredictable consequences. Many new small landowners were forced to sell their land. Many landowners abandoned their land and migrated to countries like Spain, Venezuela, and the United States.

In the early 1980s, Ecuadorian emigration also saw a spike as oil prices fell due in part by the 1980s oil glut. The reduced demand for oil following the 1970s energy crisis caused for a surplus of crude oil. This resulted in Ecuador suffering an economic recession, as oil accounted for the country’s largest and main source of revenue. Another cause of Ecuadorian emigration was the El Niño event during 1982–1983. Other resources existing within Ecuador were severely damaged due to the extreme climate conditions caused by El Niño, which included floods, landslides, and torrential rains. Their fishing industry, another source of revenue, especially suffered due to a failed anchovy harvest and sardines unexpectedly moving south toward Chilean waters.

The passage of the Immigration Reform and Control Act of 1986 also was a factor in Ecuadorian emigration. It provided legal status to undocumented immigrants who arrived prior to 1982. This provided nearly 17,000 Ecuadorian immigrants with legal residency status, which allowed for them to reside in the United States permanently. This became a major source of family-sponsored Ecuadorian migration to the country. Emigration again peaked in the political turmoil of 1996–97 and the national banking crisis of 1998–99. This turmoil placed seventy percent of Ecuadorians below the poverty line by 1997.

Most immigrants who live in the United States send money home. Many immigrants get U.S. citizenship, others simply are legalized, while other groups live illegally, crossing the border from Mexico or entering by boat from Puerto Rico. Ecuadorian Americans come from every part of Ecuador. During the 1970s, most of the Ecuadorians came from the northern and central highlands, including the area around Quito.

In the 1980s, many Ecuadorians came from the coast. In the 1990s, most of them came from the southern highlands, near the border with Peru. The majority of Ecuadorian immigrants emigrate into New York City and its surrounding suburbs. The 1990 census recorded that 60 percent of Ecuadorians living in the United States live in the New York City Metropolitan Area; while another 10% live in Miami.

Ecuadorian Return Migration 
In 2008, the Great World Recession made for a decline in Ecuadorian emigration. This event also hindered two of Ecuador’s major cash flows: remittances and exports. To aid in the country's recovery, Ecuadorian President Rafael Correa implemented the Welcome Home Plan. The plan fights unemployment and serves to boost the economy by encouraging migrants to come home through various ways, including aiding returnees in their own business ventures.

Panama Hat Industry's role in Ecuadorian Emigration  

Ecuadorians had been sewing straw hats ever since the 16th century with the introduction of the Spanish Elites, it was not until 1835 when Manuel Alfaro would start an exportation business that would increase Ecuador's GDP. The success of selling and trading goods relies heavily on a country's location and at the time Ecuador was not a busy stop for travelers. Business people realized that a few miles north, a very busy stop for travelers seeking to go west during the California Gold rush; Panama. One of the only few ways to go west from the east coast or Canada fast and safe was to travel by sea to Panama, cross Isthmus and continue your journey through boat again.

Panama became the location where manufactures from Ecuador, specially in the region of Cuenca would export their hats, making Cuenca a Hat industry. A fond importer and buyer of these Hat was the United States, specifically New York. Usually women were in charge of weaving the hats and men were in charge of the business side. Although the hats were very beautifully hand crafted and took months of manufacture, imitations at a cheaper price joined the competition and fashion trends started to change, decreasing the demand for them, thus leading to the decline of the Panama Hat Trade in 1950s, and 1960s. This heavily affected the working class that actually weaved the hats and the elites whom ran the exportation sites. Laborers had to migrate out of their isolated region in hopes to find job opportunities. A wave of Ecuadorians emigrated to New York City through the same connections established during the Hat trade, they were known as "pioneer migrants".

Migration to New York was very regionally focused in Ecuador, due to the Ecuadorians high economic reliance on the revenue that the exportation industry created, which was only in Cuenca and Azuay. Ecuador was so involved in this type of economic system because of the impact of pre and post Spanish colonial rule, and thus instead of exporting hats they started to export their own people. When the pioneer migrants reached NYC their families and friends joined as well, leading to a mass out migration in duding the 1980s, and 1990s after the 1980 economic crisis that left a majority of Ecuadorians, even those living in the urban areas unemployed.

The exportation of people was facilitated by the only way that Ecuadorians knew, with the help of intermediary guides, who would provide finical needs, foraged papers, and other necessary services in their host countries. These intermediaries, known as "tramitadores," would profit through high interests imposed on prices for the journey to the states typically ranging from $6–10,000 with 10-15% interest, and Ecuador as a whole benefited from remittances sent back. So far in 2019, 780 million of Ecuador's GDP is accounted through remittances which is the second highest source of revenue. Ecuadors regional migration industry is much like the Panama Hat industry in the sense that only a few members run the operation, where the tramitadores were members of one family in an Azyuan town and money lenders as well 

In 2000, 400,000 Ecuadorians joined the other 1 million already residing in United States. Today stricter immigration policies are in effect forcing Ecuadorians that are already here to stay permanently. This transnational migration of Cuenca and New York City continues today. Ecuadorians are the third largest Latin American group in the New York City and New Jersey Area. Of all the Ecuadorians the migrate to the U.S., 62 percent of them reside in NYC as of 2005 research.

Land Reform Act of 1964 
In 1964 Ecuador passed the Land Reform, Idle Lands, and Settlement Act. The law was an attempt to end the feudal system that had existed in the Sierra for centuries. It redistributed land from absentee landlords to the peasants who farmed it. The law set the minimum amount of land to be granted in the redistribution at 4.8 hectares. However, the land redistributed to the peasant farmers was of terrible quality. It was mountainous, unfertile land and often just barely larger than the minimum required amount of land. The large farm owners kept the fertile valley land for themselves. The peasant farmers who received these small plots of land, called minifundios, received little to no government assistance. In spite of these difficulties, however, by 1984 over 700,000 hectares had been distributed to 79,000 peasants. Distribution of the land remained highly unequal. In 1982, 80 percent of the farms consisted of less than ten hectares; yet these small farms accounted for only 15 percent of the farmland.

While the Land Reform Act improved the lives and working conditions of many poor Ecuadorian farmers, it shook the country and made it unstable. The system that had been in place for so long had been remodeled and forced many of these farmers to sell their land due to lack of credit and experience. The peasant farmers left the land their forefathers had farmed for generations and headed to Venezuela and the United States.

Demographics 

Many Ecuadorians in the United States have settled in cities such as New York City (most residing in various areas of Queens, as well as in Bushwick, Brooklyn and Fordham, Bronx); Ossining, New York; Hudson, New York; Washington Heights, Manhattan; Danbury, Connecticut; Jersey City, New Jersey; Union City, New Jersey; Newark, New Jersey; Plainfield, New Jersey; Philadelphia, Pennsylvania; Chicago, Illinois; Orlando, Florida; Tampa, Florida; Fort Lauderdale, Florida; Miami, Florida; Houston, Texas; Dallas, Texas; San Antonio, Texas; Minneapolis, Minnesota; San Francisco, California; Los Angeles, California; and Cleveland, Ohio.

Queens County's percentage of Ecuadorians is about 4.7%, and it has the largest Ecuadorian community of any county in New York and in the United States, numbering just about 101,000 in 2010. Ecuadorians are the 2nd largest South American Latino group in New York City as well as in the State of New York.

Ecuadorians are the fifth largest Latino group in New York after Puerto Ricans, Dominicans, Colombians, and Mexicans. Ecuadorians also constitute Queens County's 2nd largest Latino group. Another New York group of Ecuadorians live in the Bronx, in the Morris Heights and Highbridge neighborhoods north of Yankee Stadium. Still other Ecuadorian neighborhoods are situated in Brooklyn; in New Jersey cities such as Newark and Jersey City; and in towns in Connecticut.

States with highest Ecuadorian population 
The 10 states with the largest Ecuadorian population were (Source: Census 2010):
New York - 228,216 (1.2% of state population)
New Jersey - 100,480 (1.1% of state population)
Florida - 60,574 (0.3% of state population)
California - 35,570 (0.1% of state population)
Connecticut - 23,677 (0.7% of state population)
Illinois - 22,816 (0.2% of state population)
Texas - 10,793 (less than 0.1% of state population)
Pennsylvania - 10,680 (0.1% of state population)
North Carolina - 8,110 (0.1% of state population)
Massachusetts - 7,592 (0.1% of state population)

The U.S. state with the smallest Ecuadorian population (as of 2010) was North Dakota with 55 Ecuadorians (less than 0.1% of state population).

U.S. Metro areas with largest Ecuadorian population 
The largest Ecuadorian populations are found within these areas (Source: Census 2010)

New York-Northern New Jersey-Long Island, NY-NJ-PA MSA - 316,243
Miami-Fort Lauderdale-Pompano Beach, FL MSA - 37,029
Los Angeles-Long Beach-Santa Ana, CA MSA - 23,118
Chicago-Joliet-Naperville, IL-IN-WI MSA - 22,445
Bridgeport-Stamford-Norwalk, CT MSA - 13,335
Washington-Arlington-Alexandria, DC-VA-MD-WV MSA - 10,189
Orlando-Kissimmee-Sanford, FL MSA - 9,129
Minneapolis-St. Paul-Bloomington, MN-WI MSA - 7,121
New Haven-Milford, CT MSA - 6,680
Philadelphia-Camden-Wilmington, PA-NJ-DE-MD MSA - 6,440
Tampa-St. Petersburg-Clearwater, FL MSA - 5,292
Houston-Sugar Land-Baytown, TX MSA - 5,011
Riverside-San Bernardino-Ontario, CA MSA - 4,662
Charlotte-Gastonia-Rock Hill, NC-SC MSA - 4,590
Boston-Cambridge-Quincy, MA-NH MSA - 4,287
Trenton-Princeton, NJ MSA - 4,264
Atlanta-Sandy Springs-Marietta, GA MSA - 3,944
Dallas-Fort Worth-Arlington, TX MSA - 3,004
Poughkeepsie-Newburgh-Middletown, NY MSA - 2,957
Allentown-Bethlehem-Easton, PA-NJ MSA - 2,700

U.S. counties with largest Ecuadorian immigrant population

The total nationally is 438,500. All figures are taken from the 2015 - 2019 American Community Survey per the Migration Policy Institute website.  

1) Queens County (Queens), NY -------------71,300

2) Essex County,  NJ ---------------------------- 21,800

3) Hudson County, NJ --------------------------- 20,600

4) Kings County (Brooklyn), NY ---------------19,000

5) Bronx County (The Bronx), NY ------------ 17,500

6) Westchester County, NY -------------------- 17,000

7) Cook County, IL ------------------------------- 15,900

8) Miami-Dade County, FL --------------------- 15,700

9) Suffolk County, NY ---------------------------- 14,200

10) Fairfield County, CT ------------------------- 11,500

11) New York County (Manhattan), NY ------ 11,400

12) Los Angeles County, CA ------------------- 11,400

13) Broward County, FL ------------------------- 10,800

14) Bergen County, NJ ---------------------------- 9,800

15) Union County, NJ ------------------------------ 9,700

16) Nassau County, NY --------------------------- 7,600

17) New Haven County, CT ---------------------- 5,300

18) Orange County, FL ---------------------------- 4,700

19) Hennepin County, MN ------------------------ 4,500

20) Palm Beach County, FL ---------------------- 4,200

21) Rockland County, NY ------------------------- 4,100

22) Middlesex County, NJ ------------------------ 3,600

23) Montgomery County, MD -------------------- 3,000

24) Passaic County, NJ --------------------------- 2,900

25) Mecklenburg County, NC -------------------- 2,900

26) Harris County, TX ------------------------------ 2,800

27) Mercer County, NJ ----------------------------- 2,700

28) Morris County, NJ ------------------------------ 2,600

U.S. communities with high percentages of people of Ecuadorian ancestry 
The top 25 U.S. communities with the highest percentage of people claiming Ecuadorian ancestry (as of the 2000 census, 2010 numbers in parenthesis) are:
 Sleepy Hollow, New York 10.76% (17.54%)
 Montauk, New York 8.08% (4.21%)
 East Newark, New Jersey 7.87% (19.87%)
 Ossining, New York 7.48% (19.31%)
 Patchogue, New York 7.09%
 Hightstown, New Jersey 6.31% (14.11%)
 Union City, New Jersey 5.94% (9.23%)
 North Plainfield, New Jersey 5.39%
 Town of Ossining, New York 4.98% (19.31%)
 Port Chester, New York 4.90% (9.58%)
 Hackensack, New Jersey 4.78% (9.98%)
 Springs, New York 4.46% (17.25%)
 West New York, New Jersey 4.45%
 Peekskill, New York 4.32%
 North Bergen, New Jersey 4.02%
 Harrison, New Jersey 3.90%
 Guttenberg, New Jersey 3.88%
 East Hampton, New York 3.81%
 East Windsor, New Jersey 3.39%
 Dover, New Jersey 3.37%
 Rye, New York 3.18%
 Belleville, New Jersey 3.06%
 Danbury, Connecticut 2.92% (7.57%)
 Guttenberg, New Jersey 2.9%
 Weehawken, New Jersey 2.83%

U.S. communities with the most residents born in Ecuador
The top 25 U.S. communities with the most residents born in Ecuador are:
 Sleepy Hollow, New York 10.4%
 East Newark, New Jersey 10.3%
 Ossining, New York 10.1%
 Hightstown, New Jersey 9.5%
 North Plainfield, New Jersey 7.8%
 Montauk, New York 7.8%
 Patchogue, New York 7.7%
 Union City, New Jersey 7.5%
 Wainscott, New York 6.4%
 Peekskill, New York 5.9%
 Springs, New York 5.4%
 Hackensack, New Jersey 5.3%
 West New York, New Jersey 5.2%
 Port Chester, New York 4.8%
 Queens, New York 4.7%
 Dover, New Jersey 4.6%
 Harrison, New Jersey 4.1%
 Twin Rivers, New Jersey 4.0%
 Belleville, New Jersey 3.8%
 Danbury, Connecticut 3.7%
 Newark, New Jersey 3.6%
 Spring Valley, New York 3.5%
 Tarrytown, New York 3.4%
 Brewster, New York 3.1%
 Guttenberg, New Jersey 2.9%

Notable people 

 Christina Aguilera – American singer-songwriter, actress, and television personality who is the daughter of a White mother and mestizo Ecuadorian father
 Cecilia Alvear – Latina journalist in television news and the former President of the National Association of Hispanic Journalists
 Adrienne Bailon – American actress, singer-songwriter, dancer, and television personality
 Lourdes Baird – former United States federal judge
 Nancy Bermeo – professor of political science who is the daughter of an Irish and Danish mother and an Ecuadorian father, Nuffield Chair of Comparative Politics at Oxford University
 Chico Borja – retired U.S.-Ecuadorian soccer player and current soccer coach
 Samantha Boscarino – American actress (How to Rock), Ecuadorian descent from her mother
 Charles Castronovo – American tenor
 F. Javier Cevallos – president of Framingham State University in Framingham, MA
 Violet Chachki – American drag queen, singer and actress born in Atlanta, Georgia
 Cree Cicchino – American actress from Game Shakers who has descendance from Italy and Ecuador
 Carla Esparza – professional MMA artist, partial Ecuadorian heritage
 Irina Falconi – professional American tennis player
 Raul Fernandez (entrepreneur) – son of a Cuban father and an Ecuadorian mother.
 Gabriela Barzallo – Ecuadorian born journalist
 Luis Fierro – Ecuadorian born economist, climate change expert, politician and writer.
 April Flores – American actress and plus-size model
 Alexandra von Fürstenberg - Director and businesswoman
 Jose Garces – chef and restaurant owner
 Pia Getty – independent filmmaker
 Cork Graham – writer
 George Gustines – journalist
 Vinnie Hinostroza – NHL player
 Jaime Jarrín – Spanish language voice of the Los Angeles Dodgers
 Mike Judge – American actor, animator, writer, producer, director, musician, and creator of King of the Hill and Beavis and Butthead who was born in Ecuador to parents working there
 Helado Negro – South Florida native, born to Ecuadorian immigrants and based in Brooklyn NY.
 Xolo Maridueña – Cobra Kai actor, of Ecuadorian descent
 Gerardo Mejía – Latin rapper and singer
 Nadia Mejía – Miss California USA in 2016
 Marie-Chantal, Crown Princess of Greece
 Lloyd Monserratt – (1966–2003)
 Francisco Moya – New York City Councilmember; former New York Assemblymember, from Corona, Queens
 Debbie Mucarsel-Powell – Congresswoman, first Ecuadorian American elected to the U.S. House of Representatives
 John Paulson – American hedge fund manager
 Lady Pink – graffiti artist
 Fátima Ptacek – American child actress and model
 Ernesto Quiñonez – American novelist
 Diego Serrano – American actor
 Nelson Serrano – former Ecuadorian businessman and a nationalized American citizen (since 1971) who was convicted for murder
 Hugo Savinovich – former Ecuadorian professional wrestler
 Pancho Segura – former leading tennis player
 Jason and Kristopher Simmons – American actors
 Nina G. Vaca – Chairman and CEO of PinnacleGroup
 Jose F. Valencia – President, ASA College, New York and Florida.
 Carmen Velasquez – New York Supreme Court Justice, first to be elected in New York State Civil Court (2009–2014) and Supreme Court (2015–2028)
 Roberto de Villacis – American Latino fashion designer and artist
 Emanuel Xavier – American poet, spoken word artist, novelist, editor, and activist

See also 

Corona
Jackson Heights
Ecuador–United States relations

References

Further reading
 Mumford, Jeremy. "Ecuadorian Americans." Gale Encyclopedia of Multicultural America, edited by Thomas Riggs, (3rd ed., vol. 2, Gale, 2014), pp. 47–60. online
 Pineo, Ronn F. Ecuador and the United States: Useful Strangers (University of Georgia Press, 2007).
 Pribilsky, Jason. La Chulla Vida: Gender, Migration and the Family in Andean Ecuador and New York City (Syracuse University Press, 2007).

External links
  Ecuador News newspaper

+
 
Hispanic and Latino American
American